Chanarambie Creek is a stream in the U.S. state of Minnesota.

Chanarambie is a name derived from the Dakota language meaning "hidden woods".

See also
List of rivers of Minnesota

References

Rivers of Murray County, Minnesota
Rivers of Pipestone County, Minnesota
Rivers of Minnesota